New Point is an unincorporated community in eastern Holt County, Missouri, United States. It is located approximately five miles northeast of Oregon and was originally named Grant. Its post office has closed and mail now comes from Oregon. New Point's most famous citizen is football Hall of Famer Roger Wehrli, born in 1947.

Unincorporated communities in Holt County, Missouri
Unincorporated communities in Missouri